Jean-Baptiste Martenot (Saint-Seine-l'Abbaye Côte-d’Or 26 July 1828 - 30 March 1906 Rennes), was a French architect, born in Bourgogne, in the city of Rennes. The Halles Martenot and the Préfecture Martenot are names in his honour. He is a former student of the école des Beaux-Arts.

From humble beginnings, he obtained a departmental pension to study at the École nationale des Beaux-Arts in Paris, which he attended until 1850. He won the prix Muller Sœhnée.

At 26, Martenot was named inspector of the Palais du Louvre.

In 1858, the mayor of Rennes Léon des Ormeaux appointed him to the post of chief architect of the city of Rennes, a post he held until 1895.

His works 

 His work in Rennes is important. He built a number of communal buildings, schools, markets, the belfry of the town hall, the chamber of commers, the bank, the buildings of the park, parts of the school of medicine and faculty of sciences, and the church Saint-Aubin-en-Notre-Dame-de-Bonne-Nouvelle, in Place Sainte-Anne (1884–1904).
 He is the one who addressed the general plan for the viability of the municipal canalisation of drinking water.
 The two Lices pavilions were built in 1868 and 1871 in the same style as the old Les Halles by Victor Baltard. The halles de Rennes were rare metal buildings, in a city principally built of wood and stone.
 The collège-lycée Émile-Zola was built in a style combining granite, tufa and brick.
 He also had a number of private clients, in particular, a number of hotels (hôtel Claudet, hôtel Léofanti, hôtel des Nétumières, hôtel de Léon...) and châteaux (château à Plénée-Jugon (attributed, around 1860), château du Breil à Lourmais (1862, château de Bonnefontaine à Antrain, restoration of château de Craffault (1899–1902) and gallery, North pavilion (1902) à Plédran, Côtes-d’Armor). He also built industrial establishments, such as the Imprimerie Oberthür (1870).

References

1828 births
1926 deaths
19th-century French architects
École des Beaux-Arts alumni